The D Language Foundation (DLF) is a nonprofit organization devoted to the D programming language launched on October 16, 2015.

The mission of the foundation is to foster development of the D community and is responsible for various processes within the D community, including developing the D programming language, managing intellectual rights, and raising funds.
The foundation awards scholarships to students allowing them to work on high-impact projects related to the D programming language.
The D Language Foundation also organizes developer conferences including the yearly D Programming Language Conference (DConf) 

and is an official organization in the Google Summer of Code
.

In 2015, Andrei Alexandrescu seeded the D Language Foundation's budget from his royalties  and started to work for the D Language Foundation.

Notes

External links
 D Language Foundation
 Official incorporation announcement
 Recognition as a non-profit organization

501(c)(3) organizations
Free software project foundations in the United States